Christian Shamed Burgos Atala (born August 24, 1993) is a  Mexican television personality living and performing in South Korea. He rose to prominence in 2016 as a cast member of the variety talk show Non-Summit. He is also known for his recurring appearances on Welcome, First Time in Korea? and Where Is My Friend's Home. 

In 2018, he was awarded a merit plaque by the Mexican Embassy in Korea in appreciation of his efforts to promote Mexico to the Korean public.

Filmography

Variety show

Television series

Awards 
 2018 Embassy of Mexico in Korea - Achievement plaque

References

1993 births
Living people
Mexican television personalities
Mexican expatriates in South Korea
People from Mexico City